Azganin-e Sofla (also Romanized as Azganīn-e Soflá; also known as Azganīn-e Pā’īn, Ezgenīn Pā’īn, and Pāīn Azgarin) is a village in Rudbar-e Mohammad-e Zamani Rural District, Alamut-e Gharbi District, Qazvin County, Qazvin Province, Iran. At the 2006 census, its population was 291, in 96 families.

References 

Populated places in Qazvin County